Kent Junction is a Canadian unincorporated community, located in Kent County, New Brunswick. The community is situated in southeastern New Brunswick, between Moncton and Rogersville. Kent Junction is located mainly on New Brunswick Route 126.

History

Kent Junction had a Post Office from 1884 to 1891 and again 1894–1970. In 1898 Kent Junction was a station on the Intercolonial Railway and a farming and lumbering settlement with 1 post office, 1 store, 1 hotel and a population of 75.

Places of note
Kent Lake Lodge (Community Center)

Notable people

See also
List of communities in New Brunswick

References

Bordering communities
Noinville, New Brunswick
Mortimer, New Brunswick

Communities in Kent County, New Brunswick